White Trash Heroes is the fourth studio album from the indie rock band Archers of Loaf, released in 1998 by Alias Records. In 2012 the album was reissued by Merge Records on two CDs with new, re-imagined art by Casey Burns.

Track listing
All songs written by Eric Bachmann, Eric Johnson, Matt Gentling and Mark Price.
  "Fashion Bleeds" – 3:59
  "Dead Red Eyes" – 4:03
  "I.N.S." – 2:56
  "Perfect Time" – 4:35
  "Slick Tricks and Bright Lights" – 5:28
  "One Slight Wrong Move" – 3:20
  "Banging on a Dead Drum" – 3:12
  "Smokers in Love" – 2:40
  "After the Last Laugh" – 3:45
  "White Trash Heroes" – 7:47

2012 Reissue Bonus CD/downloads
  "Jive Kata" - 3:38
  "Fashion Bleeds (4-Track Demo)" – 4:10
  "Dead Red Eyes (4-Track Demo)" – 3:51
  "Slick Tricks and Bright Lights (4-Track Demo)" – 5:12
  "One Slight Wrong Move (4-Track Demo)" – 3:35
  "Banging on a Dead Drum (4-Track Demo)" – 2:49
  "Smokers in Love (4-Track Demo)" – 2:35
  "After the Last Laugh (4-Track Demo)" – 3:46
  "White Trash Heroes (4-Track Demo)" – 5:03
  "Untitled and Forgotten (4-Track Demo)" - 3:22
  "Walk of Shame" - 2:58
  "Untitled" - 1:40
  "Whooh!" - 3:03
1 is from the band's 1997 fan club 7" single; 11-13 are unreleased B-sides.

Personnel
Eric Bachmann - vocals, guitar
Matt Gentling - bass
Eric Johnson - guitar
Mark Price - drums

References

Archers of Loaf albums
1998 albums
Alias Records albums
Merge Records albums
Fire Records (UK) albums